Govind Prasad Mishra (born 2 August 1949 in Kosta Pawai, Sidhi) is an Indian politician, belonging to Bhartiya Janata Party. From 1993–1998, he was a member of the Madhya Pradesh Legislative Assembly. In the 2009 election he was elected to the 15th Lok Sabha from the Sidhi Lok Sabha constituency of Madhya Pradesh.

Mishra is an agriculturist and advocate. He is married to Geeta Mishra and has 4 daughters and 4 sons.

References

External links
 Indian government profile of Mishra 

India MPs 2009–2014
1949 births
Living people
People from Sidhi district
Bharatiya Janata Party politicians from Madhya Pradesh
Madhya Pradesh MLAs 1993–1998
Lok Sabha members from Madhya Pradesh